Yowla Galdi Rural District is in the Central District of Showt County, West Azerbaijan province, Iran. At the National Census of 2006, its population (as a part of the former Showt District of Maku County) was 11,616 in 2,587 households. There were 12,382 inhabitants in 2,938 households at the following census of 2011, by which time the district had been separated from the county, Showt County established, and divided into two districts: the Central District and Qarah Quyun Districts. At the most recent census of 2016, the population of the rural district was 12,871 in 3,358 households. The largest of its 26 villages was Azim Kandi, with 476 people.

References 

Showt County

Rural Districts of West Azerbaijan Province

Populated places in West Azerbaijan Province

Populated places in Showt County